Uwe Jahn may refer to:

Uwe Jahn (coach) (born 1954), German football coach
Uwe Jahn (sprinter) (born 1971), German track and field sprinter